Rhino Camp Refugee Settlement is a refugee camp in the districts of Madi-Okollo and Terego (both formerly part of Arua District) in northwestern Uganda. It was opened in 1980 and expanded in the wake of the South Sudanese civil war to host the sudden influx of refugees into Northern Uganda. As of January 2018, the settlement had 123,243 registered refugees, mostly South Sudanese, and continues to receive new arrivals.

Education

Rhino camp Refugee settlement has seven zones which includes, Ofua Zone, Omugo Zone, Ocea Zone, Odobu  Zone, Siripi Zone, Tika Zone and Eden Zone.

As of 2020 Rhino camp Refugee settlement has a few of the following schools which have been established in the various zones as follows;

Ofua Zone

Amuru Primary School, Royal Nursery and Primary School, Cinya Primary School and Ofua Secondary school, Bright Star Primary School, Alengo ECD, and Ofua 3 Primary School Project 25.

Omugo Zone

Komoyo Primary school, St Marys Ociea Primary school and St Luke Ayitu Primary School,St Kizito Odra primary school,St Luke widi secondary school,Tinate ECD centre, St Mary's ECD centre,Loketa ECD centre, St Mary's Ocia ECD centre,St james ECD centre 

Ocea Zone

Yoro Primary School, Hope Primary School, Harmony CED, Ocea Primary School and Katiku Primary School.

Siripi Zone

Siripi Primary school, Wanguru Primary School, Ariwa Primary School, Yelulu Primary School and Ariaze  Primary  School.

Tika Zone

Tika Primary School, Olujobo Primary Schools.

Odobu Zone

Odobu Primary School, Wanyange Primary School.Rhino Camp High Secondary School.https://ugandaschools.guide/view/27663/

Eden Zone

Eden Primary School.

Omugo Primary School is a Primary School in Uganda. The School is a Government Sponsored School. The School is found in Maracha-terego District and in Omugo Sub-County.

Health
Health concern is a growing demand as health conditions become more reported in Rhino camp refugee settlement  that currently hosts more than 116,000 refugees, mostly South Sudanese, and continues to receive new arrivals. With the large influx  and continuous arrival of Refugees, Health centers have been crowded with the demanding number of the refugees hence causing delays in service providing and referrals.

The refugee health report ascertains that  number of deaths per 1,000 population across all ... Palabek, Imvepi, Rwamwanja and Rhino camp had the highest incidences of reports still suggests that the health conditions in Rhino camp is demanding.

In response UNHCR supported 95 health facilities across 12 refugee hosting districts by 2017 that provided a total of 2,129,027 medical consultations in 2017 out of which 22% were to host population. ... There were 19 maternal death across all refugee settlements which were all investigated and documented.

Local reports from the RWC (Refugee welfare council) still out cries for a better and professionalized mode of treatment, they continued to demand for more local language speaking volunteers to be added to the hospital as language aids hence increasing communication efficiency between the patients (Refugees) and the medical officers

Rhino camp refugee has a number of mini health facilities that zone distributed I.e

1. Ocea Zone,  Ocea Health Center 2 

2. Siripi Zone,  Siripi Health Center 3 

3. Odobu Zone,    Odobu Health Center 2

4. Tika Zone, Olujobu Health Center 3

5.Ofua Zone,  Ofua Health Center 3

6. Omugo Zone, Omugo Health Center 3

Omugo Health Center IV

Ocia health centre 3

Water

According to the Uganda Refugee Response Monitoring Settlement Fact Sheet: Rhino Camp (January 2018), Few water sources and difficult to pump boreholes contribute to long waiting times for refugees to access water. Poor quality ground water means expensive piped water networks have to be constructed; with the settlement dependent on water provisioning through trucking as construction is ongoing. Additionally, the quality of water from the tanks is poor, with reports of occasional contamination.

The other water sources in Rhino Camp refugee Settlement Arua District  include;

 Boreholes in all the seven Zones of Rhino Camp Refugee Settlement.
 Motorized Solar Power Borehole.
 Water solar pump system which pumps water and produces 200,000-300,000 litres of water per day helping to raise the amount of water each refugee household gets from the initial average of 5-7 litres per day to 18 litres per person per day.
 Water trucking.

lifestyle 
People in Rhino camp are very united.

They practice their cultural dances in the Refugee Camp.

Environment/Natural resources
Two settlements of Rhino camp and Imvepi host 13% of the refugee population with majority women, children and youth hailing from South Sudan.

With the intense pressure on natural resources, refugees are conflicting with host communities on natural resources for survival, there is increased degradation of soils, water, tree cover leading to high temperatures, low water table, drought, irregular rainfall patterns, low crop yields, heavy winds that cause intense destruction to the temporary houses and food crops among others. With support from CARE International in Uganda, Rural Initiative for community West Nile, a local NGO based in Arua district in West Nile Sub region initiated climate action  action programs like planting of trees, recycling non biodegradable materials, and others. The refugees were also bedeviled with the inability to access natural energy when the need arises. This situation will spur them to rely heavily on unclean and nonrenewable energy sources such as charcoal, wood, traditional biomass, and kerosene which will eventually pollute the environment as these energy sources can emit high intensity of carbon content

Rhino camp is divided in to main regions, Upper Rhino and Lower Rhino, and each of these different segments of Rhino camp refugee settlement have a diverse texture and terrain in its lands, for example the upper part of Rhino which includes, Ofua zone, Omugo, Amuru and the rest has a rocky terrain, and the lower Rhino which includes Ocea zone, Eden zone, Odobu zone and the rest has a sandy terrain of soils which affects the farming.

Social work environment

Rhino camp refugee settlement has been blessed with numerous and yet sprouting community led initiatives that work tirelessly alongside other partners and donors in levying support in different thematic areas to the refugees. These community based initiatives are organized and recognized by the Office of the prime minister Uganda and work under a district directive. These initiatives seek to provide a platform for refugees in skills development, peace building and social cohesion, gender equality, entrepreneurship and livelihood, education, health etc.

Relocation

Due to the current influx of refugees, Rhino camp settlement has been a host to 116,000 refugees with more still coming.

Upon arrival, refugees are registered and sent to reception centers where their data is taken and then they are transferred or relocated to settlements.

They receive social amenities and domestic items which include blankets, mats, solar lights, saucepans, and food.

References

Refugee camps in Uganda
Terego District
Populated places in Uganda